is a former Japanese football player.

Playing career
Hiraoka was born in Yaita on March 13, 1972. After graduating from Juntendo University, he joined Japan Football League club Otsuka Pharmaceutical in 1994. He played many matches as center back. In 1997, he moved to Kyoto Purple Sanga. Although he played many matches in 1997, he could hardly play in the match in 1998. In 1999, he moved to newly was promoted to J2 League club, Oita Trinita. He played many matches as regular player. In September 2000, he moved to Nagoya Grampus Eight. He played many matches as regular player until early 2001. However his opportunity to play decreased from late 2001 season. In 2004, he moved to J2 club Omiya Ardija. Although he could hardly play in the match in 2004, the club was promoted to J1. He played many matches in 2005. However he could hardly play in the match from 2006 and retired end of 2007 season.

Club statistics

References

External links

1972 births
Living people
Juntendo University alumni
Association football people from Tochigi Prefecture
Japanese footballers
J1 League players
J2 League players
Japan Football League (1992–1998) players
Tokushima Vortis players
Kyoto Sanga FC players
Oita Trinita players
Nagoya Grampus players
Omiya Ardija players
Association football defenders